Ben Bowen (2002–2005) was a US child whose family raised funds for cancer research after his death from cancer.

Ben Bowen or Benjamin Bowen may also refer to:

 Ben Bowen (musician) (born 1976), Canadian children's musician
 Sir Ben Bowen Thomas (1899–1977), civil servant and Welsh university President
 Benjamin John Bowen or Jackie Bowen (1915–2009), Welsh rugby player

See also
Benjamin Bowen House